Brachodes powelli is a moth of the family Brachodidae. It is found in Italy, Spain and North Africa.

References

Moths described in 1922
Brachodidae
Moths of Europe
Moths of Africa
Taxa named by Charles Oberthür